Andreas "Andi" Goldberger (born 29 November 1972) is an Austrian former ski jumper. He became the first man in history to jump over 200 metres in 1994, although he didn't manage to stand.

Career
He won the World Cup overall titles three times (1993, 1995, 1996), the Four Hills Tournament twice (1992/93, 1994/95), with multiple medals in the Nordic World Championships and Winter Olympics.

Despite his success at ski jumping, Goldberger preferred ski flying—a more extreme version of normal ski jumping, in which distances are far greater.

On 17 March 1994, during training for the Ski Flying World Championships on Velikanka bratov Gorišek in Planica, Slovenia, he recorded a jump of 202 metres (663 ft); this made him the first man to ever to jump over two hundred metres, but he touched the snow upon landing, thus making the jump invalid as an official world record (Finland's Toni Nieminen would later land a 203 m jump at the same event).

On 18 March 2000, he set the ski jumping world record distance at 225 metres (738 ft) on Velikanka bratov Gorišek in Planica, Slovenia It stood for the next three years.

World Cup

Standings

Wins

Ski jumping world records

 Not recognized! Ground touch at world record distance, but first ever jump over 200 metres.

Controversy
In 1997 Goldberger admitted to the use of cocaine, and was given a six-month ban from the Austrian Ski Association. As a result of that ban, in November 1997, he even declared he would, from that moment on, compete under the flag of the Federal Republic of Yugoslavia. Yet, after reaching an agreement with the Austrian Ski Association, he continued competing for his native Austria.

End of career
Goldberger last World Cup appearance as a ski jumper was in Lahti on 6 March 2005 (49 place). Goldberger officially retired and ended his career with his final jump as a test jumper on 13 January 2006 at flying hill in Kulm, Austria. He jumps at World Cup competition as a test jumper with helmet cam for Austrian national TV station ORF, where he works as a co-commentator.

References

External links

 – click Vinnere for downloadable pdf file 

 

1972 births
Austrian male ski jumpers
Austrian sportspeople in doping cases
Doping cases in ski jumping
Holmenkollen Ski Festival winners
Living people
Olympic bronze medalists for Austria
Olympic ski jumpers of Austria
Ski jumpers at the 1994 Winter Olympics
Ski jumpers at the 1998 Winter Olympics
Olympic medalists in ski jumping
FIS Nordic World Ski Championships medalists in ski jumping
Medalists at the 1994 Winter Olympics
World record setters in ski flying
People from Ried im Innkreis District
20th-century Austrian people